The Nottingham Heritage Railway (formerly known as Great Central Railway (Nottingham) and Nottingham Transport Heritage Centre) is a heritage railway and transport museum on the south side of the village of Ruddington in Nottinghamshire.  The route consists of almost  of the former Great Central Railway Main Line from Loughborough South Junction (with the Midland Main Line) to Fifty Steps Bridge and the site of Ruddington's former GCR station, plus a branch line from Fifty Steps Bridge to  Ruddington Fields station which is located on a former Ministry of Defence site next to Rushcliffe Country Park.

There are stations open to the public at Ruddington Fields (within the main centre site) and at Rushcliffe Halt. The GCR(N) aim to re-open the former station at East Leake in the longer term.

The railway is currently not connected to Great Central Railway (at Loughborough Central in Leicestershire), although there are plans well underway and work has started to reunite the two preserved lines by bridging the Loughborough Gap. This is a major engineering project that is expected to be completed during 2024 - 2028. Some  of the line was used by gypsum trains serving the British Gypsum works at East Leake until early 2020.

Preservation history 
After the major part of the GCR main line was closed by British Rail in 1966, a section from Nottingham to Rugby was retained until 1969. Preservationists had hoped to convert that into a live heritage line, but funding was impossible to obtain — except for the length from Loughborough to Belgrave and Birstall, north of Leicester. British Rail decided to maintain rail connection from Loughborough to Ruddington MoD depot until closure and the GCR main line became an unsignalled BR single-track branch. It was also considered that British Gypsum was unlikely to bring in any more bulk materials from coal-fired power stations by rail. The GCR Northern Development Association was formed with the aim of reconnecting the then two GCR sections once again. Work initially concentrated on restoring Rushcliffe Halt, but when Nottinghamshire County Council, which had acquired the whole of the 220 acre MoD site, agreed to lease 12 acres of the former MOD site to the Association, the grand scheme of the Nottingham Transport Heritage Centre was devised to encompass not only railway preservation but any transport heritage relevant to the area.

In the 1990s, work on what had become the Great Central Railway (Nottingham) Ltd was concentrated mainly at Ruddington. The transfer of former BR property to Railtrack and then Network Rail hindered attempts to purchase the line. Ironically, it was British Gypsum's intention to renew rail freight traffic that was the catalyst that allowed the GCR(N) to buy the line and restore it initially for freight use.

At East Leake station, houses were built on the former goods yard in the 1980s and some were built only yards from the remaining track. The disused nature of the line combined with a solicitor's error led the new occupants to believe that the line was closed, but BR had never listed the line as closed and could have resumed operations at any time. However, when the GCR(N) applied for a Transport and Works Act 1992 Order to purchase and operate the line, objections from local residents resulted in a permanent limit on hours of passenger train operation through the former East Leake Station and the station remaining closed.

For Network Rail to route freight trains onto the line during the week and GCR(N) to operate heritage trains at the weekend, a length of rail north of East Leake was removed to create two separate railways. However, because of the 'rail break', the GCR(N) were unable to access Rushcliffe Halt. This has now been updated with an alternative system of work. Despite the full line between Loughborough South Jn and Ruddington being owned by the GCN(N), when the GCR(N) require to operate trains into East Leake or through to Loughborough, possession of the line is taken from Network Rail. Network Rail then lock the line out of use from their end allowing GCR(N) operation through to Loughborough. From 2003, regular services to Rushcliffe Halt resumed. Passenger trains further south continued to run on a regular basis to the proposed "Loughborough High Level", although no station facilities exist here.

In 2021, the "Great Central Railway (Nottingham)" was renamed as the "Nottingham Heritage Railway".  This follows the temporary closure of the line after being served with an improvement notice by the Office of Rail and Road in October 2020 for not having an "established a safety management system in relation to the examination, maintenance and repair of structures on their railway infrastructure such as the bridges and Barnstone tunnel."  This was followed by public arguments between the groups preserving the two sections of the route of the original Great Central Main Line, and the Great Central Railway sending a solicitor's letter ordering the "Great Central Railway (Nottingham)" to stop using the GCR title due to customer confusion relating to the closure of sections of the "Great Central Railway (Nottingham)".  The line remained closed for the 2020 and 2021 seasons.

The railway route 

Ruddington Fields is the main station on the line and the home of the Great Central Railway (Nottingham). It features a road transport building, locomotive sheds, GCR signal box (ex Neasden), miniature and model railways, cafe, visitor centre, toilets and car park. The Rushcliffe Country Park, created over the balance of the ex MoD site, surrounds the GCRN facilities here. In 2009, a new platform was opened and a second platform is currently part way through construction.

The gated Asher Lane Crossing is on a private road which was formerly the MOD depot perimeter road. It is a short walk from the Country Park to the crossing, where it is possible to see trains passing and the crossing keeper at work. There was a set of sidings here, called Asher Lane Exchange Sidings, but they have since been removed.

Fifty Steps Bridge is the end of the spur from Ruddington Fields, known as Ruddington South Junction, where trains reverse for the onward journey to Loughborough. The bridge itself originally had 'Fifty Steps' but subsequent modifications have increased that number. The former Ruddington station is further north and, following the reunification of the two halves of the preserved GCR, could see improvements made to aid towards eventual reopening, the trackbed being owned by the charity, East Midlands Railway Trust, to support the eventual extension of the line.

The Gotham branch-line was a short, freight branch connected to the Great Central Mainline via Gotham Sidings; it was lifted in 1969. The branch originally served a gypsum mine which was located on the north-western side of the village of Gotham. The sidings will be reinstated along with a short section of the branch line following reunification as part of a project to double-track the Nottingham section of the GCR. Trains pass across wide open countryside at Gotham Moor, which has much wildlife, and the line passes under a few bridges.

Rushcliffe Halt railway station is named after the nearby "Rushcliffe Golf Club". Station development is ongoing with a new footbridge being prepared to replace the original which was dismantled. Just next to the station at Hotchley Hill is the British Gypsum works. On weekdays, trainloads of gypsum would be delivered to the works and unloaded on the concrete pad visible from the station platforms.  An Art Deco LNER signal box (Hotchley Hill) replaced the original GCR structure in the late 1940s when the sidings were extended. It is currently under restoration by the Signalling and Telecoms department, who reached a major milestone in December 2022 with the new floor and stove installation being completed.

The original station near the centre of the village of East Leake is currently disused and exists only as an island platform with the stairwell of the station's subway bricked up. There are long-term aspirations to reopen the station but this would require the Transport and Works Order under which the railway powers were transferred to the present company to be amended.

Barnstone Tunnel (which is 98 yards long) is the only tunnel on the preserved line. It was built by the Victorian navvies and was dug out by hand. Located close to the tunnel was another set of sidings, which although removed could be reinstated in the future for extra storage. Between the Tunnel and Loughborough the line follows the ridge forming the Eastern side of the Soar Valley. The railway continues towards Loughborough, passing close to the hamlet of Stanford-on-Soar. The line travels over the River Soar at Stanford Viaduct, close to the Brush works, now part of WABTEC.

GCRN operaions terminate at a Stop Board close to the A60 road. Beyond that is the connection to Network Rail and the Midland Main Line (MML) at Loughborough South Junction. Plans are well under way to reconnect the two halves of the preserved GCR with the new bridge across the MML, the refurbishment of the Grand Union Canal bridge, and more recently, the replacement of the A60 Bridge all completed and fundraising for the next stage underway.

The GCR is currently seeking donations for the next two stages the "Factory Flyover" to which over £1.25 million has been raised by donors so far.

Railway collection 

The railway operates classic steam / diesel hauled services to Rushcliffe Halt and Loughborough. Most trains are steam-hauled, but the resident classic heritage diesel collection is extensive. GC Railway (Nottingham) operate every Sunday and Bank Holiday Mondays from Easter through to October, and also Saturdays during school holidays, and during December ('Santa Specials' during weekends before Christmas and on Christmas Eve, and post Christmas services on 27/28 December).
As well as regular services, GCRN also operate a host of Special Events and 'Gala' days.
There are 7 steam locomotives permanently based at the railway, 6 of them being of industrial origin, 4 of these being locomotives which once worked at Stewarts & Lloyds at Corby, Northamptonshire. The line has also hosted locomotives of BR/Big 4 pedigree, notable examples in recent years being GWR 3700 Class 3440 City of Truro, LBSCR Terrier 662 "Martello" and LNER O4 63601 and currently is home to an LNER B1 No.1264.

Locomotives 

Steam locomotives
Hudswell Clarke  No. 54 "Julia", built in 1937 Undergoing restoration
Manning Wardle  No. 1762 "Dolobran", built in 1910 Undergoing restoration
Manning Wardle  No. 2009 "Rhyl", built in 1921 Undergoing restoration
Manning Wardle  No. 2015 "Arthur", built in 1953 Stored in Ruddington Yard awaiting restoration
S160  No. 1631. Stored in kit form around the yard at Ruddington complete with a large number of spares. Long-term restoration is underway.
GCR Class 2  No. 567. Under construction.
LNER Thompson B1 No.1264, Awaiting Restoration

Main line diesel locomotives
Class 20 Bo-Bo No. 20154. (BR Blue, full yellow ends). Operational.
Class 31 A1A-A1A No. 31463 (D5830). (BR Golden Ochre). Operational, visiting from Great Central Railway.
Class 37 Co-Co No. 37340 (37009). (BR Blue). Undergoing restoration.

 Diesel Shunters
 Ruston and Hornsby 165  No. D2959 (Non standard livery). Stored awaiting engine repairs.
 Sentinel  No. H014 (RMS Locotec Blue). Undergoing repairs prior to entering service.
 Class 03  No. D2118 (BR Blue). Undergoing overhaul.
 Class 08  No. 08114 (BR Blue). Operational.
 Class 08  No. 08220 (BR Blue). Operational.

 Diesel multiple units
 BR Class 116 hybrid unit 51138+59501+51151 running with Class 117 (BR Mid-Brunswick DMU Green) Under overhaul.
 BR Class 108 unit 53645+53926. (Blue and Grey) Under restoration.
BR Class 144 unit 144003

Carriages 

 BR Mk1 carriages
 Mk1 RMB (Restaurant Miniature Buffet) 1811 in lined maroon. (Undergoing overhaul)
 Mk1 CK  (Composite Corridor) 16168 in lined maroon livery. (Operational)
 Mk1 CK  (Composite Corridor) 16190 in lined maroon livery. (Operational)
 Mk1 TSO (Tourist Standard Open) 4207 in plain maroon livery. (Operational)
 Mk1 RSO (Restaurant Second Open) 1012 later Cinema Coach 150353. (Stored)
 MK1 SK (Corridor Second) 25693 in blood and custard livery. (Operational).
 BR Mk2 carriages
Mk2 BSO (Brake Standard Open) 9389 ( Under major repair)
Mk2a TSO 5365  (Stored pending disposal)
Mk2a TSO 5376  (Stored pending disposal)
Mk2b TSO 5497  (Stored pending disposal)
Mk2a BSK 35512 (Stored - overhaul abandoned)
BR Mk3 carriages
Mk3 SLEP (Sleeper Coach) 10602.(Stores vehicle. Private Owner. Unserviceable)
Mk3 RFM 10202 (Under restoration - BR blue grey livery. Owned by 125 Group)
Mk3 RFM 10206 (Operational - BR reverse blue grey livery. Owned by 125 Group)
Mk3 TSO 12087 (Operational - Intercity livery. Owned by 125 Group)
Mk3 TSO 12134 (Operational - Intercity livery. Owned by 125 Group)
Mk3 TGS 44000 (Under restoration - GWR green livery. Owned by 125 Group)
Six wheelers
MSLR 6 wheeler 946. (Stored)
MSLR 6 wheeler 373. (Stored)
GCR Barnum carriages
GCR Barnum dining coach 664. (Stored)
GCR Barnum brake coach 695. (Stored)
GCR Barnum Dining coach 666. (Stored) (NOTE: Is the only original GCR coach owned by the National collection)
GCR Barnum bar coach 228. (Being restored undercover)
Other carriages
GCR Clerestory brake coach 1663. (Stored)
GCR Suburban brake coach 555. (Stored)
GCR Suburban composite coach 799. (Stored)
Non-passenger carrying stock
BR Mk1 GUV (General Utility Van) 86565. (Stored)
BR Mk1 GUV (General Utility Van) 86129 in lined maroon livery. (Operational)

Wagons 

Brake vans
 BR 20-ton Brake Van 952282 built in 1954. (Stored pending overhaul)
 LMS 20-ton Brake Van 357771 built in 1927. (Awaiting resumption of overhaul)
 BR 20-ton Brake Van 954353 built in 1958. (Operational, painted in BR Bauxite)
Vans
 BR Palvan 779761 built in 1958. (painted army green)
 BR Widefit 784455 built in 1962. (painted BR Bauxite)
 BR 29-ton VAA 200631 built in 1976.
 BR Widefit 783447 built in 1962. (painted army green)
 BR Palvan 778771 built in 1959. (painted BR Bauxite)
 BR Palvan 776155 built in 1957. (painted army green)
 BR Palvan 782111 built in 1960. (painted army green)
 BR Widefit 783257 built in 1962. (painted army green)
 Railfreight Pressed Steel Box Van 786902.
 Railfreight Pressed Steel Box Van 201055.
 BR Ferry Van 786902 built in 1962.
Ballast wagons
 BR Dogfish ballast hopper wagon 993039 built in 1959. (Operational, painted BR Black)
 BR Dogfish ballast hopper wagon 983586 built in 1960. (Operational, painted BR Black)
 BR Dogfish ballast hopper wagon 993597 built in 1959. (Operational, painted BR Black)
 BR Dogfish ballast hopper wagon 993230 built in 1957. (Operational, painted BR Black)
 BR Grampus open wagon 991831 built in 1958. (Operational, painted BR Black)
 BR Shark ballast plough 993874 built in 1959. (Operational, painted BR Black)
Open wagons
 LMS 12-ton open wagon 411453 built in 1937. (painted BR Bauxite)
 Flat wagons
 LMS 50-ton Warwell 721218 built in 1949. (Operational, painted Brown)
 BR Weltrol 900936 built in 1960. (Operational)
 LNER 22-ton Lowmac wagon 230964 (Operational, painted BR Grey)
 BR Bogie Bolster 943545 built in 1953. (painted brown)
 BR Bogie Rail Sturgeon A 994271 built in 1956.
 BR Bogie Rail Sturgeon A 994770 built in 1953.
 BR Weltrol 900937 built in 1960, a standard gauge well wagon for carrying narrow gauge rolling stock ; built 1960
 Rail cranes
 LNER Cowans Sheldon 45-tonne Steam Rail Crane 941602 (9017). (painted Lined BR Black with early crest)

GCR Rolling Stock Trust 
A Charity called the GCR Rolling Stock Trust based at the Great Central Railway (Nottingham) owns the third largest (after the Bluebell Railway and Isle of Wight Steam Railway) collection of pre-grouping rolling stock known to exist in the UK, including the famous 'Barnum' carriages (so named as these were the type hired by P.T. Barnum's travelling circus) and some items that even herald from the days of the Manchester, Sheffield and Lincolnshire Railway—the GCR's title before completing the London extension. The details of the stock are below.

 Six Wheeler GCR No 946. At the Mountsorrel & Rothley Heritage Center Museum shed where it is displayed in fully-restored condition.
 Barnum Bar coach No 228 built in 1910. The group's current restoration project.
 Barnum Brake Coach No 695 built in 1910. Awaiting restoration.
 Barnum Open Saloon No 666 built in 1910. Awaiting restoration. Now moved to Swithland Sidings on the other GCR site. 
 Barnum Open Saloon No 664 built in 1910. Awaiting restoration.
 Clerestory 1st and 3rd class No 1663. Awaiting restoration.
 Suburban No 799. Outside with good framework and the roof has recently been tarpaulined.
 Suburban GCR Coach No 555. Parted from its frames at the moment.
 Six Wheeler No 373 GCR. Stored with poor body and major work needed on the frames.

GCR suburban 1905 No.793, not part of the RST collection but under the wing of the GCR 567 Group is currently stored at Swithland Sidings — just been examined and found to be in very poor condition. Now placed under a new tarpaulin for further weather protection.

Nottingham Area Bus Society 

Also located at the GCRN is the Nottingham Area Bus Society, which boasts an extensive collection of vintage buses, immaculately restored and maintaned, that originally operated for local bus companies. Bus rides are offered several times a year during vehicle rallies. The bus collection is available to view during the railway's open days.

 Operational Vehicles
Barton Transport AEC Regent V 854 FNN, built in 1960.
Barton Transport Leyland PD1 JVO 230, built in 1947.
Barton Transport Leyland PS1/1 WAL 782, built in 1948. (Originally a single-decker, re-bodied as a double-decker when sold to Barton in 1957).
Barton Transport Leyland Leopard XRR 615M, built in 1973.
Barton Transport Bedford YMT RRR 517R, built in 1976.
Nottingham City Transport AEC Regent III OTV 161, built in 1954.
Nottingham City Transport Leyland Atlantean ARC 666T, built in 1978.
Midland General Bristol MW DNU 20C, built in 1965.
Midland General Leyland National XRB 415L, built in 1972.
Northern General Leyland Atlantean ORC 545P, built in 1976. (An open-topper. Painted in a Trent red and cream livery).
Leicester City Transport Leyland PD1 DJF 349, built in 1946. (Operational but restoration still ongoing).
Felix Bus Services Bedford SB1 618 KRA, built in 1959.
 Non-operational Vehicles
Barton Transport AEC Reliance DAL 771J, built in 1970. (Under repair).
Barton Transport Leyland Leopard HAL 703J, built in 1970. (Undergoing restoration, originally of Tyne Valley with the identity of VTY 543J).
Barton Transport Leyland PD1 KNN 254, built in 1949. (Undergoing overhaul).
Barton Transport Leyland BTS1 VVO 735, built in 1957. (Undergoing restoration).
South Notts Leyland Lion LT5 VO 8846, built in 1933. (Stored in the workshop awaiting restoration).
South Notts Leyland Royal Tiger PSU1/11 MAL 310, built in 1951. (Undergoing restoration in the workshop).
Trent Buses Volvo Citybus B10M-50 F609 GVO, built in 1989. (Undergoing restoration).

References

External links 

Heritage railways in Nottinghamshire
Great Central Railway (preserved)
Railway museums in England
Museums in Nottinghamshire